Agathia hemithearia is a species of moth in the family Geometridae. It was first described by Achille Guenée in 1857. It is found in India, Sri Lanka, China (Hainan), Taiwan and Thailand.

Description
Its wingspan is about 36 mm. The markings are rufous. The thorax and abdomen are more heavily marked. Forewings with a medial band of regular width, and angled on median nervure. Both wings with rufous outer area irrorated (sprinkled) with fuscous, with a waved postmedial grey line enclosing some conjoined sub-marginal green patches below the apex of each wing and near the inner margin of the hindwings. There is a green area sending a prominent tooth in to the rufous area at vein 5 and below vein 2 of each wing. The ocellus is reduced to a pale line across the tail. Ventral side with purplish fuscous markings.

References

Geometrinae
Moths of Asia
Moths described in 1857